Nguyễn Thanh Tùng (born 5 July 1994), known professionally as Sơn Tùng M-TP, is a Vietnamese singer-songwriter and actor. Born and raised in Thái Bình, Thái Bình province, his family discovered his singing ability when he was two years old. His self-written 2012 and 2013 singles, "" and "" launched his career. These were followed by successful singles "", "" and "". In 2017, Tùng released the compilation album M-tp M-TP and published his autobiography, .

Tùng spent four years as part of Văn Production and WePro Entertainment before founding his own record label, M-TP Entertainment, in 2016. His other ventures include the M-TP Ambition Tour (2015–2016), the Sky Tour (2019), a starring role in the 2014 film Dandelion (which earned him a Golden Kite Prize for Young Prominent Actor) and an appearance as a contestant on the television series The Remix. Called a "King of V-pop" for his popularity, Tùng has received many accolades which include a MTV Europe Music Award, a Dedication Music Award, a Mnet Asian Music Award, seven Green Wave Awards and an inclusion on Forbes Vietnam 2018 30 Under 30 list.

Life and career

1994–2012: Early life and career 
Nguyễn Thanh Tùng was born on 5 July 1994 in Thái Bình, Thái Bình province, to parents Nguyễn Đức Thiện and Phạm Thị Thanh Bình. Bình was a traditional dancer in the city's official performing group and a performer in Thái Bình's chèo theatre. She met Thiện when he was working as a transport driver. After becoming pregnant with Tùng, Bình opened a barbershop at home which later became a clothing store. She also used to work as a bridal make-up artist. The singer described his early life as "peaceful." He has a younger brother, Nguyễn Việt Hoàng ( 2000), who later also becomes a singer in 2022 with the stage name MONO.

He was two years old when the family discovered his singing ability. At the age of  eight, he joined Thái Bình's Children's Arts and Culture Palace and learned to play the electronic keyboard. Tùng's mother plays guitar, and her husband plays seven instruments. However, they disapproved of their son's pursuit of a singing career and wanted him to focus on education; his father wanted him to study business in college. Despite this, Tùng frequently participated in talent shows at school. In 2009, he and his classmates formed a group, Over Band, and began writing and uploading songs on the independent-music website LadyKillah. Rap artist Hoàng Kê, one of the site's participants, invited the singer to join his Young Pilots hip hop group in 2010. Young Pilots recorded and performed across Thái Bình, successful in their hometown and online. At this time, Tùng adopted the stage name M-TP, which was an acronym for Mr. Tùng Pình, a nickname bestowed by fellow LadyKillah member Mr. J. According to the singer, it now stands for "music," "tài năng" ("talent"), and "phong cách" ("style").

Tùng originally wrote "Cơn mưa ngang qua" for Over Band and Young Pilots before deciding to record the song himself. He published it on the music website Zing MP3 in August 2011, and within two months of release, it had 1.7 million streams. "Cơn mưa ngang quas success exceeded Tùng's expectations. It received the Song of the Month award from the music-chart TV program Favorite Song in October 2012, and a Zing Music Award for R&B Song of the Year. Two revised versions of the song were released in February 2012. That year, he was admitted to the Conservatory of Ho Chi Minh City with one of its highest entrance scores. He left the conservatory in June 2014, while filming Dandelion, due to scheduling conflicts and a desire to focus on his future career. In July 2012, he auditioned for Vietnam Idol fourth season and was eliminated in the first round. He signed a five-year contract with Văn Production in November 2012 and changed his stage name from M-TP to Sơn Tùng M-TP after a suggestion came from the company's music director, Huy Tuấn, and musician Hà Quang Minh.

2013–2015: Breakthrough and Dandelion

Tùng released three singles between August and December 2013: "Nắng ấm xa dần", "Đừng về trễ" and "Em của ngày hôm qua". The latter launched Tùng's mainstream career and successfully gained over 100 million streams in three months on Zing MP3. Favorite Song made it its Song of the Month in February 2014. Tùng wrote "Gió cuốn em đi", which was performed and released by Quốc Thiên in April 2014. The following month, Tùng contributed vocals to a charity cover of Tạ Quang Thắng's "Sống như những đóa hoa" and canceled a number of performances for surgery to remove a tumor from his leg. In that June, it was announced that the singer would star in Dandelion, a semi-biographical film based on the life of late singer Wanbi Tuấn Anh. Quang Huy, founder and chief executive officer of WePro Entertainment, directed the film. Dandelion was released in December 2014. It grossed ₫60 billion (US$2.8 million) at the box office and became one of the most profitable Vietnamese films of all time. Tùng's performance earned him a Golden Kite Prize, the Vietnamese equivalent of an Academy Award, for Young Prominent Actor.

Its soundtrack produced two successful singles by Tùng: "Chắc ai đó sẽ về" and "Không phải dạng vừa đâu". The music video for "Không phải dạng vừa đâu" was criticized. It featured look-alikes of musicians Phó Đức Phương and Dương Khắc Linh, both whom had lambasted Tùng's copyright controversies. Many publications considered Tùng's video "disrespectful" of the older musicians, which led WePro to issue an apology, stating that the idea was intended to represent the generation gap in music. Although the company withdrew the video and planned to film another one, it was re-uploaded shortly afterwards.  "Chắc ai đó sẽ về" later won a WeChoice Award for Song of the Year.

In November 2014, the singer was suspended for six months by Văn Production for contract violations, including him not following the schedules and cancelling shows without permission. Tùng later terminated the contract, accusing the company of exploitation and not fulfilling its obligations. In January 2015, Văn Production sued the singer for wrongful termination and defamation. A legal adviser told VnExpress that the contract was a service-level agreement which did not address termination, and the singer might had the right to terminate. It was reported in early 2015 that Tùng had signed with WePro while still being managed by his former company.

2015–2017: The Remix and concerts

In January 2015, Tùng joined a team with disc jockey Trang Moon and music producer SlimV on the first season of the television competition series The Remix. His team competed against other notable acts, such as Đông Nhi and Tóc Tiên, to create the best remixes on the program. Tùng's performance each week received considerable media coverage but he quit after six episodes, citing health issues. Two songs he introduced on the show, "Thái Bình mồ hôi rơi" and "Khuôn mặt đáng thương", were released as singles  the following February and March. In June, Tùng recorded "Tiến lên Việt Nam ơi!" in support of Vietnam's team at the Southeast Asian Games. Three of his other singles, "Ấn nút nhớ... Thả giấc mơ" (written for an advertising campaign for Omo), "Âm thầm bên em" and "Buông đôi tay nhau ra", were released between June and December 2015. Although they were modest commercial successes compared to their predecessors, "Âm thầm bên em" received a Green Wave Award for Single of the Year.

In July, eight thousand tickets for Tùng's first major concert in Ho Chi Minh City, M-TP & Friends, sold out in two weeks. His Dandelion castmates, including Hari Won and Phạm Quỳnh Anh, were the show's opening acts. At the 2015 MTV Europe Music Awards, Tùng received the Best Southeast Asian Act award and was nominated for Best Asian Act. In December 2015 and January 2016, Tùng's M-TP Ambition – Chuyến bay đầu tiên concert tour played in Ho Chi Minh City and Hanoi. In his 2017 autobiography, Chạm tới giấc mơ, he called the tour one of his life's "unforgettable failures." It was reported that only half of the tickets for the first concert were sold and, although a number of critics appreciated the singer's stage presence, others felt the show lacked content. Two songs he introduced on tour, "Remember Me" and "Như ngày hôm qua", were released as singles in December 2015. Tùng's YouTube channel released recordings of the concerts in November 2016.

In January 2016, he guest judged an episode of The Remix second season and endorsed Oppo's Tết campaign with the song "Một năm mới bình an". At the 11th Dedication Music Award in April, Tùng became the youngest recipient of the Singer of the Year award. He also won the Favorite Male Artist category at that year's Zing Music Awards. Tùng released his single "Chúng ta không thuộc về nhau" in August 2016. It was Google Vietnam's most-searched song of 2016, YouTube's 11th-most-disliked video of the year and WebTVAsia Awards' Most Popular Video in Vietnam. Due to his creative conflicts with WePro since the M-TP Ambition tour, Tùng announced that he had parted ways with the company in December 2016.

He established M-TP Entertainment, and released three singles in early 2017: "Lạc trôi", "Nơi này có anh" and "Bình yên những phút giây". The music video for "Lạc trôi" was described as a "play on Asian stereotypes," such as gold thrones and statues of dragons. It and "Nơi này có anh" were two of the fastest Asian music videos to receive 100 million views on YouTube, and were two of the year's top streaming tracks in Vietnam. Green Wave and WeChoice Awards later gave the former track the Single of the Year and Favorite Music Video awards, respectively. Tùng's last solo release for WePro, "Bình yên những phút giây", was a single written as part of a promotion for Không Độ green tea.

2017–present: M-tp M-TP, Sky Tour Movie and Chúng ta 

In April 2017, Tùng released the compilation album M-tp M-TP to commemorate his fifth anniversary in the music industry. Released physically in USB flash drive format, it contained most of his past tracks with new remixes. One thousand copies were reportedly sold at its signings in Ho Chi Minh City and Hanoi. In June 2017, Tùng performed at the Viral Fest Asia in Bangkok, Thailand, and conducted a second M-TP & Friends concert in Hanoi in the following month. He starred in Âm bản (2017), a short film sponsored by Oppo, and took part on "Gia đình tôi chọn", a single marking WePro's fifteenth anniversary in that August. The singer's autobiography, Chạm tới giấc mơ, was published in September. It detailed Tùng's early life and his time with Văn Production and WePro Entertainment, omitting the controversies surrounding his career. Ten thousand copies of the book were sold in its first two days. Tùng later received a Mnet Asian Music Award for Vietnamese Breakout Artist, a Keeng Young Award for Favorite Male Artist, a V Live Award for Best V Star and a WeChoice Award for Breakout Artist.

In May 2018, his single "Run Now" was released with a music video featuring Thai actress Davika Hoorne. Many Catholic viewers condemned its usage of William-Adolphe Bouguereau's 1876 painting Pietà, as it was seen burning in the video. "Run Now" was awarded two Zing Music Awards for Music Video of the Year and Most Favorite Dance/Electronic Song, and a WeChoice Award for Most Favorite Music Video. Later in July, the singer played a fictionalized version of himself in Chuyến đi của thanh xuân, a short film sponsored by Biti's and directed by Nguyễn Quang Dũng. Tùng's collaboration with rapper Snoop Dogg, "Give It to Me", was released in July 2019. The accompanied video features an appearance by singer Madison Beer and set a 24-hour record for Vietnamese music videos with 25.8 million YouTube views on the first day. This record was previously held by "Chạy ngay đi" (17.6 million views).

The singer embarked on his second nationwide concert tour, Sky Tour, from July to August 2019. The show was divided into two sets. The first half featured performances by guest acts such as Tiên Tiên, Rhymastic and Kimmese, while the other half was Tùng's solo set. Tickets to the Hồ Chí Minh and Hà Nội dates sold out. Despite many panning strict security measures at the concerts, critics still praised the performances and Tùng's audience interaction. The tour was chronicled in the documentary film, Sơn Tùng M-TP: Sky Tour Movie, which debuted in June 2020. Dubbed as Vietnam's first musical documentary, it grossed ₫5.5 billion (US$238.700) after the first three days of release even with mixed reviews. Netflix went on to distribute the film globally. An accompanying live album was also released.

Later that year, Tùng released "Có chắc yêu là đây" and the lead single from his forthcoming extended play Chúng ta, "Chúng ta của hiện tại". The former became the 4th-most streamed music video premiere on YouTube at the time with 901.000 concurrent viewers. Tùng also became the first Vietnamese musician to enter the Billboard Social 50 chart that July at number 28.

On April 24, 2021, he released his music video Muộn rồi mà sao còn on YouTube.  On April 28, 2022, he released his music video "There's No One at All'' on Youtube, making his comeback after a year absent.

Controversies
In 2014, several of Tùng's songs, including "Em của ngày hôm qua" and "Cơn mưa ngang qua", were accused of plagiarism. The singer initially denied the allegations in 2012. In 2014, he admitted to using others' backing tracks as references to create his own work. The songs in question were later removed from the music television program Favorite Song. The Green Wave Awards also banned "Em của ngày hôm qua" from that year's shortlists. In October 2014, Tùng's "Chắc ai đó sẽ về" received comparisons to "Because I Miss You", a 2011 track recorded by Korean singer Jung Yong-hwa. Jung's record label, FNC Entertainment, found that there was no copyright infringement. Vietnam's Ministry of Culture, Sports and Tourism temporarily banned both "Chắc ai đó sẽ về" and its accompanied film Dandelion, requesting a new version of the single to be produced. A remix was eventually released.

In 2016, "Chúng ta không thuộc về nhau" was criticized for its similarities to Charlie Puth's "We Don't Talk Anymore" and BTS' "Fire"; leading two musicians, Tùng Dương and Vũ Cát Tường, to chide the singer. In 2021, music producers Robin Wesley and GC accused Tùng of plagiarizing their work for his singles, "Có chắc yêu là đây" and "Chúng ta của hiện tại", respectively. GC later stated that he and Tùng's record label had eventually resolved their dispute.

In May 2022, shortly after releasing his new song “There’s No One At All”, it was called out that the music video was found to have visuals that may have negative impacts on morality, public health and psychosocial well-being. On May 5, the Chief Inspector of the Ministry of Culture, Sports and Tourism issued a decision to sanction M-TP Entertainment Co., Ltd. Specifically, the company was fined 70 million VND along with returning the profit earned from the music video and remove the visual aspect of "There's No One At All" of the social platforms.

Artistry 

Tùng recalled in his autobiography Chạm tới giấc mơ that he frequently listened to his grandparents singing Quan họ (a Vietnamese folk music style originating in Bắc Ninh) as a child. Its signature vocal style eventually affected his way of singing slur notes, and Vietnamese folk music in general has inspired his work. The singer later grew up listening to artists such as Quang Vinh, whom he idolized, Chris Brown, Rihanna and Justin Bieber. Tùng has also been influenced by the Vietnamese underground hip hop scene and K-pop acts, including Big Bang, Super Junior and TVXQ. After the death of Thái Bình-born composer An Thuyên in 2015, he said that Thuyên was the biggest influence on his artistry, and expressed appreciation when the composer defended him during the controversy surrounding "Chắc ai đó sẽ về" in 2014.

His early releases contain pop, contemporary R&B and hip-hop elements. Tùng followed electronic dance music later in his career, with the tropical house-oriented "Chúng ta không thuộc về nhau" (2016) being one of his first releases in the genre. Some of his productions also incorporated Vietnamese traditional musical instruments—most notably "Lạc trôi" (2017), which is a future bass track featuring the đàn tranh and sáo. In a 2014 interview, Tùng said that most of his romantic lyrics were inspired by Korean dramas and his former high-school crush; the latter was most evident in the lyrics of "Em của ngày hôm qua" (2013). Many of his early songs referred to rain, and so he was nicknamed "the Rain Prince" by the early press. "Không phải dạng vừa đâu" and "Remember Me" were 2015 tracks Tùng wrote in response to the backlash against his career. He performed them with his signature rap vocals, which over the years were often described as being unclear and divided public reception. Also in addition to electronic keyboards, Tùng plays the piano.

Public image and achievements

Tùng, as one of the most successful Vietnamese contemporary music artists, has been called the "King of V-pop". Forbes Vietnam and Thể thao & Văn hóa described the singer "a phenomenon of Vietnamese pop". According to Thể thao & Văn hóa Cung Ly, Tùng's knack for "smoothly" blending originality with mainstream K-pop was the reason for his success. However, public reception during his early career was polarized. Due to Tùng's past copyright issues, his work was frequently compared to other foreign songs. Forbes Vietnam contributor Phan T. Trang wrote that although the public has been more "generous and open" towards the singer since the releases of "Lạc trôi" and "Nơi này có anh", the Vietnamese industry at large still doubts his creativity.

In 2015, the WeChoice Awards named Tùng one of its five Inspiration Ambassadors (the awards show's top honor). It also voted him one of the ten most influential people in Vietnam in 2014 and 2017, and one of 2015's five most influential artists. In May 2016, U.S. President Barack Obama mentioned Tùng during a speech examining the impact of social media on young Vietnamese. The speech was part of Obama's town-hall meeting with members of the Young Southeast Asian Leaders Initiative in Ho Chi Minh City. In 2018, Forbes Vietnam included Tùng in its annual 30 Under 30 list. He has also been included on the Green Wave Awards' top-five Favorite Singers (Top Hit board) list three consecutive times since 2015.

Tùng has been described as a fashion icon, despite his fashion and music being repeatedly compared to South Korean musician G-Dragon and members of BigBang. In 2017, Vietnamese Elle gave him a Style Award for Most Stylish Male Singer. His fan base, Sky, has a large following in the country. Tùng has endorsed a number of brands and companies, including Oppo, Yamaha and Jollibee. Oppo launched the singer's phone line, Sơn Tùng M-TP Limited Edition F3, in June 2017. A pair of shoes from Biti's Hunter collection sold out after its product placement in the "Lạc trôi" music video. Biti's recognized it as a factor in its 300-percent increase in sales, which helped revive the brand. In September 2016, Tùng's red-carpet interview at The Face Vietnam first season finale went viral. It inspired memes, remixes, original songs performed by Hồ Ngọc Hà, Noo Phước Thịnh and Only C, and eventually received a WeChoice Award for Catchphrase of the Year. Only C's song, "Yêu là 'tha thu'", was on the soundtrack of the film Em chưa 18 (2017) and became a hit.

Discography

Extended plays

Compilation albums

Live albums

Singles
As lead artist

As featured artist

Promotional singles

Headlining tours 
 M-TP Ambition – Chuyến bay đầu tiên (2015–2016)
 Sky Tour (2019)

Filmography

Film

Television

Music videos

Notes

See also
 Honorific nicknames in popular music

References

External links

 
 

1994 births
Living people
Vietnamese idols
Vietnamese pop singers
21st-century Vietnamese male singers
Vietnamese male film actors
Vietnamese songwriters
Vietnamese pianists
People from Thái Bình province
Male pianists
21st-century pianists
MTV Europe Music Award winners